Jorge Bustos or Jorge Busto was a Mexican film editor. He was the brother of José W. Bustos.

Selected filmography
 While Mexico Sleeps (1938)
 The Priest's Secret (1941)
 Beautiful Michoacán (1943)
 The Spectre of the Bride (1943)
 Divorced (1943)
 Wild Flower (1943)
 The Lieutenant Nun (1944)
 The White Monk (1945)
 Twilight (1945)
 I Am a Fugitive (1946)
 Tragic Wedding (1946)
 Five Faces of Woman (1947)
 Fly Away, Young Man! (1947)
 The Genius (1948)
 Nocturne of Love (1948)
 The Magician (1949)
 Tender Pumpkins (1949)
 Philip of Jesus (1949)
Sinbad the Seasick (1950)
 The Lost City (1950)
 Stolen Paradise (1951)
 We Maids (1951)
 Women's Prison (1951)
 The Atomic Fireman (1952)
 Seven Women (1953)
 The Photographer (1953)
 Women Who Work (1953)
 The Three Elenas (1954)
 The White Rose (1954)
 To the Four Winds (1955)
 Chucho el Roto (1960)
 To Each His Life (1960)
 Invincible Guns (1960)
 Carnival Nights (1978)
 The Pulque Tavern (1981)

References

Bibliography 
 Raymond Durgnat. Luis Bunuel. University of California Press, 1977.

External links 
 

Year of birth unknown
Year of death unknown
Mexican film editors